Shankar Punatambekar (1923 – 2016) was a writer in Hindi language. He is known as a satirist. His literary output includes short stories, novels, one-act plays, based on satire and reviews.

Literary career
He brought a different kind of satirical novel in Hindi.Two of his popular novels include, Ek Mantri Swarglok Main (translation:a minister in heaven) and 
Janha devta marte hai (translation:Where gods die).
Puntambekar also wrote Vyangakosh (dictionary of satire) in Hindi. The book includes 9500 words in Hindi with Puntambekar's own satirical meaning for each word.

Awards 
Punatambekar was honored with awards such as 'Vyangyashree', 'Chakallas' and 'Muktibodh'.

References 

1923 births
2016 deaths
Hindi-language writers
Hindi novelists